cis-Inositol is one of the isomers of inositol.

See also
allo-Inositol
D-chiro-Inositol
L-chiro-Inositol
epi-Inositol
muco-Inositol
neo-Inositol
scyllo-Inositol
myo-Inositol

References

Inositol